Any Man's Death is a 1990 South African thriller drama film directed by Tom Clegg and starring John Savage, William Hickey, Mia Sara and Ernest Borgnine.

Plot 
An investigative journalist is sent to the volatile frontiers of Angola and South-West Africa to investigate the disappearance of a photographer during the South African Border War. He eventually stumbles across an unrepentant Nazi war criminal who researches local snake venom in the hopes of finding a cancer cure.

Cast  
John Savage as Leon Abrahams
William Hickey as Erich Schiller / Ernst Bauricke
Mia Sara as Gerlind
Michael Lerner as Herb Denner
Ernest Borgnine as Herr Gantz
Tobie Cronje as Johann
Damarob as Oskar
Sam Barnard as Captain Jacobs
James Ryan as David Caplan
Jeff Fannell as Greenlow
Robin Smith as Ulrich
Claudia Udy as Laura
Nancy Mulford as Tara

References

External links 

1990s thriller drama films
South African thriller drama films
South African Border War films
Films set in Angola
Films set in Namibia
Films about Nazi hunters
Films shot in Namibia
Apartheid films
1990 drama films
1990 films
1990s English-language films
English-language South African films
Films directed by Tom Clegg (director)